This is a list of spider species that occur on Socotra. Unless otherwise noted, they are endemic (they occur only there).

Agelenidae
 Agelenella pusilla (Pocock, 1903)

Araneidae
 Araneus cardioceros Pocock, 1899
 Gasteracantha sanguinolenta C. L. Koch, 1844 — also in Africa and São Tomé
 Nephila sumptuosa Gerstäcker, 1873 — also in East Africa

Oxyopidae
 Oxyopes rutilus Simon, 1890  — also in Yemen
 Peucetia viridis Blackwall, 1858, 1844  — also in Yemen

Barychelidae
 Atrophothele socotrana Pocock, 1903

Cheiracanthiidae
 Cheiracanthium socotrense Pocock, 1903

Gnaphosidae
 Zimiris diffusa Platnick & Penney, 2004 — also in St. Helena and India

Hersiliidae
 Hersilia wraniki Rheims, Brescovit & van Harten, 2004 — also in Yemen

Migidae
 Moggridgea socotra Griswold, 1987

Oonopidae
 Gamasomorpha deksam Saaristo & van Harten, 2002
 Orchestina bedu Saaristo & van Harten, 2002
 Orchestina foa Saaristo & van Harten, 2002
 Silhouettella usgutra Saaristo & van Harten, 2002
 Socotroonops socotra Saaristo & van Harten, 2002

Oxyopidae
 Oxyopes rutilius Simon, 1890 — also in Yemen

Palpimanidae
 Scelidomachus socotranus Pocock, 1899

Philodromidae
 Thanatus forbesi Pocock, 1903

Pholcidae
 Leptopholcus dioscoridis Deeleman-Reinhold & van Harten, 2001

Salticidae
 Afrobeata firma Wesołowska & van Harten, 1994
 Bianor biguttatus Wesołowska & van Harten, 2002
 Habrocestum albopunctatum Wesołowska & van Harten, 2002
 Habrocestum dubium Wesołowska & van Harten, 2002
 Habrocestum ferrugineum Wesołowska & van Harten, 2002
 Habrocestum inquinatum Wesołowska & van Harten, 2002
 Habrocestum socotrense Wesołowska & van Harten, 2002
 Habrocestum speciosum Wesołowska & van Harten, 1994
 Hasarius insularis Wesołowska & van Harten, 2002
 Heliophanillus suedicola (Simon, 1901) — also in Yemen
 Heliophanus parvus Wesołowska & van Harten, 1994
 Pellenes striolatus Wesołowska & van Harten, 2002
 Pseudicius mirus Wesołowska & van Harten, 2002
 Rafalus insignipalpis Simon, 1882 — also in Yemen
 Thyene similis Wesołowska & van Harten, 2002

Sparassidae
 Olios socotranus (Pocock, 1903)

Tetragnathidae
 Tetragnatha granti Pocock, 1903

Theraphosidae
 Monocentropus balfouri Pocock, 1897

Theridiidae
 Latrodectus hystrix Simon, 1890 — also in Yemen

Thomisidae
 Bassaniodes socotrensis Pocock, 1903
 Dimizonops insularis Pocock, 1903

Zodariidae
 Cydrela insularis (Pocock, 1899)

References
 Platnick, N.I. (2007). The world spider catalog, version 7.5. American Museum of Natural History.

.Socotra
Socotra
Spiders
Spiders
Socotra